Eupithecia cohorticula is a moth in the family Geometridae. It is found in Kyrgyzstan.

References

Moths described in 1910
cohorticula
Moths of Asia